The 2017 Kehoe Cup was an inter-county and university hurling competition in the province of Leinster. The competition is ranked below the Walsh Cup and features second and third tier counties from Leinster. Maynooth University were the winners.

Format

The seven teams are drawn into one group of three teams and one group of four teams. Each team plays the other teams in its group once, earning 2 points for a win and 1 for a draw. The two group winners play in the final.

County teams

Longford
Louth
Wicklow

Third level teams
Maynooth University
DCU St. Patrick's Campus (formerly St Patrick's College, Drumcondra)
Trinity College Dublin
Institute of Technology, Tallaght

Player availability

Universities do not have ‘first call’ on hurlers from counties participating in the Leinster Championship Qualifier Group (i.e. Laois, Meath and Westmeath) or playing in the 2017 Christy Ring Cup (i.e. Carlow and Kildare) unless the hurler is in receipt of a college scholarship.

Universities have ‘first call’ on county hurlers up to a maximum of six, chosen from Dublin, Kilkenny, Offaly, Wexford and Galway.

After the Kehoe Cup group stage is completed hurlers who played with their university may play for their county in the final if their college did not qualify for the Kehoe Cup final.

Group stage

Group 1

Group 2

Final

References

Kehoe Cup
Kehoe Cup